Grégory Mallet (born 21 March 1984) is a French Olympic swimmer.

Career
Mallet swam for France at the 2008 Olympics, where he was part of France's silver-medal winning 4 × 100 m freestyle relay after he swam in the preliminary heats.  At the 2012 Summer Olympics he also swam in the final of the men's 4 × 200 m freestyle relay to help France win the silver medal.

References

1984 births
Living people
Olympic swimmers of France
Swimmers at the 2008 Summer Olympics
Swimmers at the 2012 Summer Olympics
Swimmers at the 2016 Summer Olympics
Olympic silver medalists for France
World record setters in swimming
French male freestyle swimmers
World Aquatics Championships medalists in swimming
European Aquatics Championships medalists in swimming
Medalists at the 2012 Summer Olympics
Medalists at the 2008 Summer Olympics
Olympic silver medalists in swimming
20th-century French people
21st-century French people